The EFDA Nations Cup, was a Country vs Country competition for Formula Opel cars between 1990 and 1998. It had always been Dan Partel's dream to stage a race that pitted drivers in equal cars racing for their country. The Formula Opel/Vauxhall one make racing series offered the best opportunity for such an event.

The 1992 EFDA Nations Cup (Nations Cup III), was held at Estoril, Portugal (4 October 1992).

Final positions

References

External links
 Fastlines International
 Driver Database

EFDA Nations Cup
EFDA Nations Cup seasons
EFDA Nations Cup
EFDA Nations Cup